Zlokuchene Glacier is the 13 km long and 3.5 km wide glacier on Nordenskjöld Coast in Graham Land, Antarctica situated north of Risimina Glacier, east of Rogosh Glacier and south of the lower course of Drygalski Glacier.  It is draining from Mrahori Saddle eastwards between Kyustendil Ridge and Lovech Heights to flow into Weddell Sea northwest of Pedersen Nunatak.

The feature is named after the settlements of Zlokuchene in western and southern Bulgaria.

Location
British mapping in 1978.

Maps
 Antarctic Digital Database (ADD). Scale 1:250000 topographic map of Antarctica. Scientific Committee on Antarctic Research (SCAR), 1993–2016.

References
 Zlokuchene Glacier. SCAR Composite Antarctic Gazetteer.
 Bulgarian Antarctic Gazetteer. Antarctic Place-names Commission. (details in Bulgarian, basic data in English)

External links
 Zlokuchene Glacier. Copernix satellite image

Glaciers of Nordenskjöld Coast
Bulgaria and the Antarctic